Bartonella pachyuromydis is a bacterium from the genus Bartonella which was isolated from Rodentia.

References

External links
Type strain of Bartonella pachyuromydis at BacDive -  the Bacterial Diversity Metadatabase

Bartonellaceae
Bacteria described in 2013